San Yisheng (fl. 11th century BC) was a top official of the early Western Zhou dynasty.

Plot in Fengshen Yanyi
Grand Counselor San has been renowned as the protector of both the Ji province and Ji Chang of Mount Singing Phoenix – who he has served for many upon many years. Throughout the many contributions of Commander/Grand Counselor San, he would be most remembered for subduing Chong Houhu's coalition with a simple letter of rationality during the Su Hu arc. Even after Ji Chang had been imprisoned for over the time of seven years, San Yisheng would continue to remain as a loyal sword of the Ji province.

Once the news of Bo Yikao's death had reached the ears of the people of Mount Singing Phoenix, San would be the first to console the people and create a rational conclusion. The top priority would be to retrieve Ji Chang, and not go to war against the Shang dynasty yet. Thus, San would compose a letter to Supreme Counselors Fei Zhong and You Hun and effectively attain their consent that Ji Chang should be released for his loyalty and devotion to the king.

Notes

References
 Investiture of the Gods chapter 20

Chinese gods
Investiture of the Gods characters
Shang dynasty people
Zhou dynasty nobility
11th-century BC Chinese people